Prochoreutis solaris is a moth of the family Choreutidae. It is known from northern Europe, Russia, the Kuril Islands and Japan (Hokkaido).

The wingspan is about 12 mm. The forewings have a dark brown ground color. The hindwings are somewhat paler. There are three black patches on the median area of the forewing.

Adults are on wing during the day.

References

External links
Japanese Moths

Prochoreutis
Moths of Japan
Moths of Europe